March 28 - Eastern Orthodox liturgical calendar - March 30

All fixed commemorations below are observed on April 11 by Orthodox Churches on the Old Calendar.

For March 29th, Orthodox Churches on the Old Calendar commemorate the Saints listed on March 16.

Saints

 Martyrs Jonas and Barachisius, and companions, in Persia, under Shapur II (330):  (see also: March 28)
 Abibus, Zanithas, Elias (Helias), Lazarus, Mares, Maruthas, Narses, Sabbas, Simiathos (Sebeethes, Symeethes).
 Saint Mark the Confessor, Bishop of Arethusa (364)
 Hieromartyr Cyril, Deacon, of Heliopolis, and others, who suffered under Julian the Apostate (364)
 Venerable John of Egypt, anchorite (4th century)
 Saint Diadochos of Photiki, Bishop of Photike in Old Epirus, whose works are included in the Philokalia (ca. 486) 
 Venerable Hesychios the Sinaite, Abbot of Saint Catherine's Monastery at Mount Sinai (7th century) 
 Saint Eustathius the Confessor, Bishop of Kios in Bithynia (9th century)

Pre-Schism Western saints

 Martyr Secundus of Asti, a noble from Asti in Piedmont in Italy and an officer in the imperial army, beheaded in Asti under Hadrian (119)
 Saints Armogastes and Companions (c. 460)
 Saints Gwynllyw (Gundleus) and Gwladys (Gladys), parents of St. Cadoc (5th century)
 Saint Firminus, Bishop of Viviers in France (6th century)
 Saint Lasar (Lassar, Lassera), a nun in Ireland and niece of St Forchera (6th century)
 Saint Eustasius of Luxeuil (Eustace), Abbot of Luxeuil (625)

Post-Schism Orthodox saints

 Venerable Jonah (1480), Mark (15th century), and Bassa of the Pskov-Caves Monastery.
 Saint Nicetas, desert-dweller of the Roslavl Forests, near Bryansk (1793)

New martyrs and confessors

 New Martyrs Priest Paul Voinarsky, and brothers Paul and Alexis Kiryan, of the Crimea (1919)
 New Hieromartyr Michael Victorov, Archpriest, of Boloshnevo, Ryazan (1933)

Icon gallery

Notes

References

Sources
 March 29/April 11. Orthodox Calendar (PRAVOSLAVIE.RU).
 April 11 / March 29. HOLY TRINITY RUSSIAN ORTHODOX CHURCH (A parish of the Patriarchate of Moscow).
 March 29. OCA - The Lives of the Saints.
 The Autonomous Orthodox Metropolia of Western Europe and the Americas (ROCOR). St. Hilarion Calendar of Saints for the year of our Lord 2004. St. Hilarion Press (Austin, TX). p. 25.
 March 29. Latin Saints of the Orthodox Patriarchate of Rome.
 The Roman Martyrology. Transl. by the Archbishop of Baltimore. Last Edition, According to the Copy Printed at Rome in 1914. Revised Edition, with the Imprimatur of His Eminence Cardinal Gibbons. Baltimore: John Murphy Company, 1916. p. 90.
 Rev. Richard Stanton. A Menology of England and Wales, or, Brief Memorials of the Ancient British and English Saints Arranged According to the Calendar, Together with the Martyrs of the 16th and 17th Centuries. London: Burns & Oates, 1892. pp. 136–137.
Greek Sources
 Great Synaxaristes:  29 ΜΑΡΤΙΟΥ. ΜΕΓΑΣ ΣΥΝΑΞΑΡΙΣΤΗΣ.
  Συναξαριστής. 29 Μαρτίου. ECCLESIA.GR. (H ΕΚΚΛΗΣΙΑ ΤΗΣ ΕΛΛΑΔΟΣ). 
Russian Sources
  April 11 (March 29). Православная Энциклопедия под редакцией Патриарха Московского и всея Руси Кирилла (электронная версия). (Orthodox Encyclopedia - Pravenc.ru).
  29 марта (ст.ст.) 11 апреля 2013 (нов. ст.). Русская Православная Церковь Отдел внешних церковных связей. (DECR).

March in the Eastern Orthodox calendar